An Ordinary Love Story is a 2012 Thai film, a romantic comedy about love, presented with various aspects of it. The movie stars Billy Ogan and model Sonia Couling, and was directed by Chatchawan Siwabumrungchai.

Plot 
The movie centres on a wedding where the love stories of four couples ensue, ranging from light-hearted to dramatic. The stories include a long-term husband & wife, a couple who is going to hold their wedding, co-workers and young men.

Cast
 Billy Ogan as Nueng
 Sonia Couling as Winnie
 Komen Raungkijratanakul as Note
 Benchanat Aksonnantha as Nam
 Khanitkun Netbut as Ploy
 Ping Monotone as Tam
 Sunkianti Bunnak as Guy
 Wattana Chumsai Na Ayuthaya as Boat
 Achita Sikamana as Suzi

Awards and nominations
 Nominee National Film Association Award : Best Actor by Komen Raungkijratanakul

Trivia
 Opening film of Hua Hin International Film Festival 2012
filmed in Hua Hin District, Thailand

References

External links
 
 รัก - Siamzone
 รักลุ้น! ลับ? 'อวบอ้วน' ในหนังรัก
 ?รัก? หนังใหม่ จากค่ายน้องใหม่ 10 PICTURES 
 Review : An Ordinary Love Story | 天青色等煙宇、而我在等妳
 รัก An Ordinary Love Story

Thai-language films
2012 films
2010s Thai films
Thai romantic comedy films